Salut is a song performed by Joe Dassin from his 1975 album Joe Dassin (Le Costume blanc) (CBS 81147).

It was also released as a single, in 1976 with "Et si tu n'existais pas" on the other side.

It is a French adaptation, by Pierre Delanoë and Claude Lemesle, of an Italian song, "Uomo dove vai" (by Toto Cutugno).

It is one of the most famous songs by Joe Dassin.

Track listing 
7" single (CBS 4112 and CBS C5 8122)
 "Et si tu n'existais pas" (3:25)
 "Salut" (3:20)
or
 "Salut" (3:20)
 "Et si tu n'existais pas" (3:25)

Cover versions 
 2013: Hélène Ségara with Joe Dassin on the album Et si tu n'existais pas

References 

1975 songs
1976 singles
Joe Dassin songs
French songs
CBS Disques singles
Songs written by Pierre Delanoë
Songs written by Claude Lemesle
Songs written by Toto Cutugno
Songs with lyrics by Vito Pallavicini
Song recordings produced by Jacques Plait